The European Students' Union (ESU) is the umbrella organisation of 45 national unions of students from 40 countries, representing almost 20 million students. A consultative member of the Bologna Process, ESU is also a full member of the European Youth Forum (YFJ).

History 
On 17 October 1982, seven National Unions of Students (NUSes) from the United Kingdom, Sweden, Iceland, France, Denmark, Norway and Austria established the Western European Students Information Bureau (WESIB) at a gathering in Stockholm. In February 1990, WESIB dropped the "W" to become the European Student Information Bureau (ESIB) following the political upheaval in Europe at the time. In 1992 the name was changed yet again into the National Union of Students in Europe. This reflected the recognition of the changing mission of ESIB from being a pure information-sharing organisation into a political organisation that represented the views of students in European institutions. In May 2007, the current name, European Students' Union (ESU), was introduced.

Over the years, the office of ESU has moved around Europe and was first hosted by the member NUSes. Following the establishment of WESIB in Stockholm, the office was based in the SFS Office in Sweden from 1982 until 1985, funded by a grant by the Swedish Government. By 1985 the grant was running low, and so NUS UK offered to host WESIB in their London headquarters. In 1988 the office moved to the ÖH offices in Vienna and remained there until 2000 when it was decided that for reasons of being near the European institutions, the office should move to Brussels and was hosted by VVS.

Structures 
The highest ESU structure is the Board Meeting, bringing together representatives from all the National Unions of Students it represents. The Board Meeting sets the organisation's policy direction and elects members to the executive committee to run the organisation.

Executive committee 
The executive committee (EC) is elected for a one-year term at the annual Board Meeting by representatives of the member organisations, with each country (not organisation) given two votes. The president and vice-presidents together make up the presidency of ESU, and are responsible for the day-to-day operations of the organisation along with the seven general members of the EC.

Member organisations

Candidate members
Candidate-members are NUSes that have submitted an application of membership to ESU but have not yet been granted member status by the Board Meeting. Candidate-members retain their status for one year and are subject to a "study visit" by ESU to ensure they meet membership criteria.

Associate organisations
Associate members of ESU are pan-European and international student organisations that have similar goals to ESU. The criteria for associate membership require the organisation to be democratic and student-run, have either students or NUSes as members, and represent students from at least 8 countries that are parties to the European Cultural Convention. Associate organizations can attend and speak at all ESU meetings, but cannot vote at Board Meetings.

Association of Norwegian Students Abroad (ANSA)
European Dental Students Association (EDSA)
European Deaf Students' Union (EDSU)
European Nursing Students Association (ENSA)
European Medical Students' Association (EMSA)
European Pharmaceutical Students' Association (EPSA)
European Union of Jewish Students (EUJS)
Forum of European Muslim Youth and Student Organisation (FEMYSO)
International Association for Political Science Students (IAPSS)
International Federation of Medical Students' Associations (IFMSA)
International Lesbian, Gay, Bisexual, Transgender and Queer Youth and Student Organisation (IGLYO)
International Students of History Association (ISHA)
Organising Bureau of European School Student Unions (OBESSU)

List of Executive Representatives  

Prior to 1997 ESIB was Chaired by a NUS instead of an individual

See also

Eurodoc
European University Association
Education International

Notes

References

External links
ESU Website
Blog of the ESU Committee on the Commodification of Education

European student organizations
Groups of students' unions